Wrotham Park Estate Co Ltd v Parkside Homes Ltd [1974] 1 WLR 798 is an English land law and English contract law case, concerning the measure and availability of damages for breach of negative covenant in circumstances where the court has confirmed a covenant is legally enforceable and refused as it may find, as unconscionable, to issue an order for specific performance or an injunction.

Such a remedy, which had precedent before the judgment, has since become firmly known as Wrotham Park damages, which are awarded (in lieu of specific performance or an injunction) under the jurisdiction created (powers vested in the court) by s. 2 of the Chancery Amendment Act 1858 (also known as Lord Cairns' Act). Such damages centre on the hypothetical negotiated value for a release of the covenant and which so in turn may look to a share of the profits from the business venture enabled by the breach; the court decided 5% of profits should be made payable.

Facts

Wrotham Park is an estate for generations owned and lived in by gentry and then nobility including the Earl of Strafford. Outlying portions have been sold off for development, subject to some lay-out restrictions. Potters Bar Urban District Council came to own one desolate triangle of land. They offered it for sale by public auction as freehold building land for 14 houses. Parkside bought the land and built the houses, despite warnings from Wrotham Park Estate's owners that Parkside were violating the lay-out restrictions. When the houses were built, the owners of the Estate brought a claim against Parkside for breach of the restrictive covenant.

Judgment
Brightman J (as he then was) awarded damages of £2,500 as a substitute for an injunction. The damages were measured as the amount that might reasonably have been demanded by the plaintiff as payment for relaxing the covenant, being 5% of the developer's anticipated profit. He refused to make an order to demolish the houses built, preferring to award damages under Lord Cairns' Act, saying:

Impact
The jurisdiction for Wrotham Park damages has been expanded and clarified in subsequent cases, and was summarized by the Judicial Committee of the Privy Council in 2009:

Damages awarded are intended to compensate the claimant for the court's decision not to grant relief in the form of an order for specific performance or an injunction.
The court will award an amount of damages which represents the sum that the claimant might reasonably have demanded from the defendant as compensation for allowing it to breach the relevant contractual provision. The court assesses this by reference to a "hypothetical negotiation" carried out between the parties at the date of breach.
At the "hypothetical negotiation" both parties are assumed to act reasonably and the fact that the parties would never have reached a deal in reality is irrelevant.
Although these damages are awarded in place of relief e.g. an injunction, it is not a prerequisite to their being awarded that either (i) the claimant applied for the injunction in the case or (ii) there was any prospect of such application succeeding.

While founded in land law, Wrotham Park damages have been found to be available in other contexts, such as employment law in the matter of restrictive covenants.

Limitations on applicability exist. Wrotham Park damages will not be available where a plaintiff has originally sought damages for consequential economic damage, which are commonly sought in the law of nuisance for example.

Commonwealth jurisdictions 
In Singapore, the leading case on Wrotham Park damages is the case of Turf Club Auto Emporium Pte Ltd v Yeo Boong Hua.

Cases cited

Applied
Marten v Flight Refuelling Ltd [1962] Ch 115; [1961] 2 WLR 1018; [1961] 2 All ER 696, Ch D [1962] Ch 115, 136
Northbourne (Lord) v Johnston & Son [1922] 2 Ch 309, ChD

Distinguished
Powell v Hemsley [1909] 2 Ch 252, CA

Considered
Kilbey v Haviland (1871) 24 LT 353
Isenberg v East India House Estate Co Ltd (1863) 3 De GJ & Sm 263
Durell v Pritchard (1865) LR 1 Ch App 244

See also

English land law
English contract law

Further reading

References

English remedy case law
English land case law
High Court of Justice cases
1973 in British law
1973 in case law